The mixed team BC1–2 boccia event at the 2016 Summer Paralympics was held from 10 to 12 September at Riocentro, an exhibition and convention center located in Rio de Janeiro, part of the Games' Barra Cluster of venues.

Final rounds

Pool stages

Pool A

  progressed on points difference.

Pool B

Pool C

Pool D

Rosters
The twelve competing nations each entered a team of four athletes with no specifications on the athlete's gender.

Pattaya Tadtong
Watcharaphon Vongsa
Worawut Saengampa
Subin Tipmanee

Sun Kai
Zhang Qi
Yan Zhiqiang
Zhong Kai

Lee Dong Won
Yoo Won Jeong
Sohn Jeong Min
Jeong So Yeong

Takayuki Kitani
Takayuki Hirose
Yuriko Fujii
Hidetaka Sugimura

David Smith
Nigel Murray
 Joshua Rowe
 Claire Taggart

Mauricio Barbure
Sebastian Gonzalez
Maria Sahonero
Luis Cristaldo

Abilio Valente
Antonio Marques
Cristina Goncalves
Fernando Ferreira

References

Team BC1-2